The zitting cisticola or streaked fantail warbler (Cisticola juncidis) is a widely distributed Old World warbler whose breeding range includes southern Europe, Africa (outside the deserts and rainforest), and southern Asia down to northern Australia. A small bird found mainly in grasslands, it is best identified by its rufous rump; as well, it lacks any gold on the collar and the brownish tail is tipped with white. During the breeding season, males have a zigzagging flight display accompanied by regular "zitting" calls that have been likened to repeated snips of a scissor. They build their pouch nest suspended within a clump of grass.

Taxonomy and systematics 

The zitting cisticola was described by the naturalist Constantine Samuel Rafinesque in 1810 and given the binomial name Sylvia juncidis. The type locality is Campofelice di Roccella in Sicily. The current genus name Cisticola is from Ancient Greek kisthos, "rock-rose", and Latin colere, "to dwell". The specific juncidis is also from Latin and is a diminutive of iuncus, "reed".

Across their wide distribution range, several variations in populations have been noted and as many as 18 subspecies are recognized. They differ slightly in calls, plumage and size and some have been considered full species in some taxonomic treatments. The nominate form is found in southern France, Greece, Turkey, Sicily, Corsica and Egypt while western Portugal and Spain have cisticola. The population in Palestine, Syria, Iraq and Iran is neuroticus while the northern and eastern African population is uropygialis and perennius (further south). Gabon, Angola, and southern Africa are home to terrestris. The population in the Western Ghats of India, salimalii, does not show seasonal tail length variation as in cursitans of the plains of India and dry-zone of Sri Lanka, which has a longer tail in the non-breeding season. Population malaya is found in southern Southeast Asia, tinnabulans further north in southern China while brunniceps is found in Korea and Japan. Other populations include nigrostriatus (Philippines), constans (Sulawesi), fuscicapilla (east Java), leanyeri (northern Australia), normani (northwest Queensland) and laveryi (northeast Australia).

This genus is sometimes split off with various other southern warbler genera and given family status as the Cisticolidae. This species was previously known as the fan-tailed warbler, but the current name gives consistency with the many tropical cisticola species, as well as avoiding confusion with an American species also named the fan-tailed warbler.

Description 
It is brown above, heavily streaked with black markings. The underparts are whitish, and the tail is broad, white-tipped and flicked frequently, giving rise to the alternative name for the species. The adult males have less crown streaking and more back marking than the females, but there are no great differences between the sexes or the eighteen geographical races. The absence of a nuchal collar separates it from the golden-headed cisticola (Cisticola exilis). In the non-breeding season, they tend to skulk within the grass and can be hard to spot.

Habitat and distribution 

This species is found mainly in grassland habitats, often near water. Most populations are resident, but some East Asian populations migrate south to warmer areas in winter. In the Himalayas, they ascend to about  during summer but are below  in the winter. This species is a rare vagrant to northern Europe, mostly as a spring overshoot. Its European range is generally expanding, although northern populations are especially susceptible to hard winters.

Behaviour and ecology 
Zitting cisticolas are very small insectivorous birds, sometimes found in small groups. The breeding season is associated with the rains. Two broods a year occur in many regions. Males are generally polygynous, but some are monogamous. The male builds the initial nest structure deep in the grasses, and invites females using a special display. Females that accept the male complete the nest. The nest is made by binding living leaves into the soft fabric of felted plant-down, cobwebs, and grass. The zitting cisticola's nest is a cup shape with a canopy of tied-together leaves or grasses overhead for camouflage; 3–6 eggs are laid. The female incubates the eggs, which hatch after about 10 days. More than one brood may be raised. Females change their mates frequently and rarely stay within the same territory, while males are less mobile, maintaining non-overlapping song-territories which shift from day to day. Females can sometimes breed in their first year.

References

External links 

Ageing and sexing by Javier Blasco-Zumeta & Gerd-Michael Heinze (PDF; 2.8 MB)
 
 
 
 Zitting cisticola/Fantailed Cisticola – Species text in The Atlas of Southern African Birds.

zitting cisticola
Birds of Africa
Birds of East Asia
Birds of South Asia
Birds of Southeast Asia
Birds of the Middle East
Birds of Europe
zitting cisticola
zitting cisticola